The 2004 UAW-GM Quality 500 was the 31st stock car race of the 2004 NASCAR Nextel Cup Series season, the fifth race of the 2004 Chase for the Nextel Cup, and the 45th iteration of the event. The race was on Saturday, October 16, 2004, before a crowd of 140,000 in Concord, North Carolina, at Lowe's Motor Speedway, a 1.5 miles (2.4 km) permanent quad-oval. The race took the scheduled 334 laps to complete. At the race's end, Jimmie Johnson of Hendrick Motorsports would take advantage of Kasey Kahne's bad luck at the end of the race, holding off the field on the final restart to win his 11th career NASCAR Nextel Cup Series win and his third of the season. To fill out the podium, Jeff Gordon of Hendrick Motorsports and Dale Earnhardt Jr. of Dale Earnhardt, Inc. would finish second and third, respectively.

Background 

Lowe's Motor Speedway is a motorsports complex located in Concord, North Carolina, United States 13 miles from Charlotte, North Carolina. The complex features a 1.5 miles (2.4 km) quad oval track that hosts NASCAR racing including the prestigious Coca-Cola 600 on Memorial Day weekend and the NEXTEL All-Star Challenge, as well as the UAW-GM Quality 500. The speedway was built in 1959 by Bruton Smith and is considered the home track for NASCAR with many race teams located in the Charlotte area. The track is owned and operated by Speedway Motorsports Inc. (SMI) with Marcus G. Smith (son of Bruton Smith) as track president.

Entry list 

*Withdrew.

**Barrett was originally tapped to drive the #94, and Cope to drive the #92. However, the #92 team would withdraw, and Cope would move to the #94.

***Edwards drove in pre-race activities, but would not start the car on Saturday due to a NASCAR Craftsman Truck Series race he attended on the same day going late. As a result, backup driver Dave Blaney would start for Edwards, and Edwards would get in the car on lap 24. As Blaney had started the race, Blaney was credited with the finish.

Practice

First practice 
The first practice session was held on Thursday, October 14, at 2:20 PM EST, and would last for 2 hours.

Second practice 
The second practice session was held on Friday, October 15, at 4:30 PM EST, and would last for 45 minutes.

Third and final practice 
The third and final practice session, sometimes referred to as Happy Hour, was held on Friday, October 15, at 6:10 PM EST, and would last for 45 minutes.

Qualifying 
Qualifying was held on Thursday, October 14, at 7:10 PM EST. Each driver would have two laps to set a fastest time; the fastest of the two would count as their official qualifying lap. Positions 1-38 would be decided on time, while positions 39-43 would be based on provisionals. Four spots are awarded by the use of provisionals based on owner's points. The fifth is awarded to a past champion who has not otherwise qualified for the race. If no past champ needs the provisional, the next team in the owner points will be awarded a provisional.

Nine drivers would fail to qualify: Kenny Wallace, Derrike Cope, Mike Wallace, Carl Long, Kirk Shelmerdine, Larry Foyt, Hermie Sadler, Morgan Shepherd, and Geoff Bodine.

Full qualifying results

Race 
On the first lap of the race, a multi-car crash occurred in turn 1. It started when the 4th place start car in Scott Riggs when his car did not get up to speed going into turn 1. Riggs went up the track to move out of the way but Greg Biffle all of a sudden got hit from behind by John Andretti collecting Kurt Busch, Jeff Gordon, Tony Raines, and Ken Schrader. Pole sitter Ryan Newman led the first lap of the race. The race got back going on lap 8 but the caution would be immeadeatly be thrown again when Jeff Fuller blew a tire and hit the wall in turn 1. The race got back going on lap 13 with Newman still leading and got some green flag laps. On lap 23, the third caution flew when Brian Vickers crashed hard on the front stretch after contact with Robby Gordon. The race would be red flagged for a short period of time to repair the outside SAFER barrier on the front stretch. During the caution, Dave Blaney was taken out of the #99 and Carl Edwards jumped in. After the red flag was lifted, Elliott Sadler won the race off of pit road and led the field to the restart on lap 31. On lap 42, Kasey Kahne took the lead on Sadler. On lap 76, the fourth caution flew when Jeff Gordon spun off of turn 4 and got hit again by Rusty Wallace. Kahne won the race off of pit road and lead the field to the restart on lap 81. The fifth caution would fly on lap 120 for debris. Kahne won the race off of pit road and lead on the restart on lap 125. Kahne would be passed by Dale Earnhardt Jr. for the lead. On lap 130, Kahne took the lead back. On lap 172, the 6th caution flew when Matt Kenseth blew a tire and hit the wall. Kahne won the race off of pit road and lead the field to green on lap 177. Dale Earnhardt Jr. took the lead from Kahne on the restart, On lap 180, Jimmie Johnson took the lead from Jr. On lap 187, Kasey Kahne took the lead back. On lap 210, the 7th caution flew for debris. Kahne lead the field on lap 215 for the restart. On the next lap, Mark Martin took the lead. Kahne took it back on lap 220. On lap 223, the 8th caution flew when Kevin Harvick's engine blew and laid fluid. It also caused other drivers to spin like Matt Kenseth, Jeremy Mayfield, and Carl Edwards where Edwards crashed out. Race restarted on lap 232 with Kasey Kahne leading.

Final Laps 
Kahne had the most dominant performance he had during his whole rookie season. Kahne was looking for his first win in his 31st start while being the first rookie to win in the Cup Series since Tony Stewart in 1999 and Kahne had the car to win. Unfourtunetly for Kahne, his bad luck would continue. On lap 268 of the race, Kahne was leading when he went into turn 1 when all of a sudden the right front tire on his car went flat and the car shot up the race track and hit the outside wall in turn 2. This would end Kahne's race. Kahne had one of the worst ways to lose a race after having his most dominant performance of the season after he lead 207 laps of the race before he crashed out of the race while leading. While Kahne wrecked, Kyle Busch and Sterling Marlin both wrecked in turn 4. Mark Martin won the race off of pit road and was the new race leader. Martin lead the field to the green on lap 273. On lap 278, Kurt Busch would take the lead. Mark Martin would take it back on lap 281. With 33 laps to go, Jimmie Johnson took the lead from Martin. With 23 to go, the 10th caution would fly for a three car crash when Brendan Gaughan's car slowed down and would be run into from behind by Jimmy Spencer which also collected Mark Martin giving Martin damage. Martin's car would be able to come back and finish the race. Joe Nemechek lead with 17 to go on the restart but was quickly passed by Johnson. With 16 to go, the 11th and final caution flew when Michael Waltrip's car slid up and hit the wall. The race restarted with 12 laps to go and Johnson held onto the lead and won the race picking up his 5th win of the season. This would be the first of three wins in a row for Johnson. Jeff Gordon, Dale Earnhardt Jr, Kurt Busch, and Joe Nemechek rounded out the top 5 while Dale Jarrett, Elliott Sadler, Jamie McMurray, Jeff Burton, and Tony Stewart rounded out the top 10.

Race results

References 

2004 NASCAR Nextel Cup Series
NASCAR races at Charlotte Motor Speedway
October 2004 sports events in the United States
2004 in sports in North Carolina